Royal Air Force Bodorgan or more simply RAF Bodorgan is a former Royal Air Force satellite airfield located near to Bodorgan Hall on the Isle of Anglesey, Wales. The airfield was opened as RAF Aberffraw on 1 September 1940. Its named was changed to Bodrogan on 15 May 1941 and it was closed on 30 September 1945.

Bodorgan initially had one Blister hangar, with two Bellman hangars added later. Accommodation for personnel was initially in tents, which were replaced by Nissen and Maycrete huts for accommodation, workshops and technical functions. The hangars were dismantled soon after the airfield closed, but some of the huts remain at the site.

In 1942 the fields to the east of the airfield were used for the camouflaged storage of up to thirty Wellington bombers.

The following units were here at some point:
 ‘J’ Flight of No. 1 Anti-Aircraft Co-operation Unit RAF (1 AACU) became No. 1606 (Anti-Aircraft Co-operation) Flight RAF
 ‘Z’ Flight 1 AACU became No. 1620 (Anti-Aircraft Co-operation) Flight RAF
 No. 6 Anti-Aircraft Co-operation Unit RAF
 No. 8 Anti-Aircraft Co-operation Unit RAF
 No. 48 Maintenance Unit RAF
 No. 577 Squadron RAF
 No. 650 Squadron RAF

See also
 List of Royal Air Force Satellite Landing Grounds

References

Bodorgan
Royal Air Force satellite landing grounds